Brush Creek Township is one of the sixteen townships of Scioto County, Ohio, United States.  The 2010 census counted 1,199 people in the township, 1,112 of whom lived in the unincorporated parts of the township.

Geography
Located in the western part of the county, it borders the following townships:
Rarden Township - north
Morgan Township - northeast
Union Township - east
Nile Township - south
Jefferson Township, Adams County - west
Meigs Township, Adams County - northwest

The village of Otway lies in the township's northeast.

Name and history
Statewide, other Brush Creek Townships are located in Adams, Highland, Jefferson, and Muskingum counties.

Brush Creek Township was organized in 1820.  Its earliest inhabitants date to before 1800.

Government
The township is governed by a three-member board of trustees, who are elected in November of odd-numbered years to a four-year term beginning on the following January 1. Two are elected in the year after the presidential election and one is elected in the year before it. There is also an elected township fiscal officer, who serves a four-year term beginning on April 1 of the year after the election, which is held in November of the year before the presidential election. Vacancies in the fiscal officership or on the board of trustees are filled by the remaining trustees.

Education
Brush Creek Township residents are served by the Northwest Local School District and Northwest High School

References

External links
County website
 Northwest Local School District

Townships in Scioto County, Ohio
Townships in Ohio